John Rodwell may refer to:
 John S. Rodwell, ecologist
 John Medows Rodwell, English clergyman and Islamic studies scholar

See also
 Jack Rodwell, English footballer